The following is a list of Sri Lankan aviators.



A
 Harsha Abeywickrama
 Edward Amerasakera

B
 John Barker
 Graham Bladon

D
 Prashantha De Silva

G
 Harry Goonatilake
 Roshan Goonatilake
 Shirantha Goonatilake
 Nimal Gunaratne
 Kolitha Gunathilake

K
 A. Kumaresan

L
 E P B Liyanage

M
 Paddy Mendis

O
 James Peter Obeyesekere III

P
 Rohan Pathirage
 Donald Perera
 Monath Perera
 P.B. Premachandra

S
 Anusha Siriratne

W
 Jayalath Weerakkody

See also

Aviators
Sri Lanka